Kaecilius is a fictional supervillain appearing in American comic books published by Marvel Comics, primarily as an enemy of Doctor Strange. The character first appeared in Strange Tales Vol. 1, #130 (March 1965) and was created by Stan Lee and Steve Ditko.

Kaecilius made his live-action debut in the Marvel Cinematic Universe film Doctor Strange, portrayed by Mads Mikkelsen.

Publication history 

Kaecilius first appeared in Strange Tales #130 (March 1965) and was created by Stan Lee and Steve Ditko.

Fictional character biography 
Kaecilius was a disciple of Baron Mordo, who would deliver messages and even fight Doctor Strange himself if necessary. One of his first missions was to kidnap the Ancient One, a task he failed due to Doctor Strange's interference. At one point, Mordo took possession of him to test the powers of Dormammu. Kaecilius was successful in stealing Doctor Strange's Cloak of Levitation; however by the end of the battle, Doctor Strange used his powers to wipe the knowledge of magic from Kaecilius's mind. Kaecilius and his cohorts, Adria and Demonicus, posed as members of the Independent Video media network to interview Doctor Strange, as a ploy to gain access to the Sanctum Sanctorum. Claiming to be the cameraman Joe Crocker, Kaecilius was found out, along with his fellow sorcerers. The three once again tried and failed to defeat the Sorcerer Supreme. Adria attempted to use a powerful gem against Strange, but only managed to banish herself, Kaecilius and Demonicus to the Purple Dimension. Many years later, the three were freed from the Purple Dimension, and battled Doctor Strange, as well as Jane Foster in her new identity as Valkyrie. Kaecilius displayed vastly improved abilities and a modified appearance (still in his usual costume, but clean shaven and with darkened eyes). During the battle, Grim Reaper appeared, having been newly empowered by Mephisto, and trapped Doctor Strange's astral form in a dark mirror. Scared and surrounded by his defeated comrades, Kaecilius "peacefully" left the fight, opening a portal to what looked like Paris, France.

During the "Death of Doctor Strange" storyline, Kaecilius accompanied Baron Mordo into heading to the Sanctum Sanctorum where Doctor Strange was found dead. As Wong accuses Baron Mordo of killing Doctor Strange which Baron Mordo denied, Kaecilius prepared to defend Baron Mordo from Wong's attacks.  Just then, a classic version of Doctor Strange arrives having sensed that the worst has happened and asks what year is it. When the Three Mothers show up upon tracking Clea to the Sanctum Sanctorum, Baron Mordo and Kaecilius take their leave. Classic Doctor Strange, Clea, and Wong fight their way past Castle Mordo's defenses to get to the Eye of Agamotto where they managed to subdue Kaecilius. In New Umarria, Antarctica, Classic Doctor Strange, Clea, and Magik arrive and meet with Baron Mordo, Kaecilius, Aggamon, Tiboro, and Umar where he puts them through a murder mystery that involved bringing up why the inter-dimensional warlords fled to Earth and the framing of Baron Mordo. He concludes that Kaecilius is responsible for Doctor Strange's murder as Kaecilius plans to make Baron Mordo "squeal with all the agonies of the Purple Dimension" and then kill Classic Doctor Strange again with Doctor Strange's own powers. As news of the arrival of the Peregrine Child and the Three Mothers are noted, Kaecilius is prepared to attack Classic Doctor Strange who prepares to make Aggamon, Tiboro, and Umar face the consequences of their actions where everyone must prevail or die. As Kaecilius attacks, Classic Doctor Strange casts a special healing spell involving living soul and a flesh base that causes Doctor Strange to be revived.

Powers and abilities 
Kaecilius was trained in the mystic arts by his master Baron Mordo.

In other media

Film 
Kaecilius appears in the 2016 live-action film Doctor Strange, portrayed by Mads Mikkelsen. A combination of several villains from the comics, Kaecilius was used in the film to drive the introduction and development of bigger villains for the future, including Dormammu and "certain individuals who live in other dimensions". Motivated by the loss of his family to become a Master of the Mystic Arts, this version of Kaecilius became disillusioned with what he considered the Ancient One's hypocrisy, which influenced his choice to serve Dormammu by using the same life-extending ritual his former master used to channel the Dark Dimension's energy. Believing in Dormammu's promise of eternal life, Kaecilius and his Zealot followers proceed to destroy the Masters of the Mystic Arts' Sanctums so Earth can be consumed by the Dark Dimension. However, Doctor Strange manages to convince Dormammu to renounce his attack on Earth while having the entity honor his promise to Kaecilius. Dormammu agrees to the terms and drags Kaecilius and his surviving followers into the Dark Dimension.

Video games 
 Kaecilius appears in the mobile game Marvel: Future Fight.
 Kaecilius appears in the mobile game Marvel Avengers Academy.
 Kaecilius appears as a boss in the mobile game Marvel Puzzle Quest.

References

External links 
 Kaecilius at Marvel Wiki
 

Characters created by Stan Lee
Characters created by Steve Ditko
Comics characters introduced in 1965
Fictional kidnappers
Fictional murderers
Fictional wizards
Marvel Comics characters who use magic
Marvel Comics male supervillains
Marvel Comics martial artists
Marvel Comics supervillains